Nissei may refer to:

Nisei, second-generation Japanese immigrants in the Americas
Nippon Life or Nissay, Japanese life insurance company
Nissei-chuo Station, railway station in Inagawa, Hyōgo, Japan
Nissei Line, route of Nose Electric Railway from Yamashita Station to Nissei-chuo Station
Nissay Theatre, theatre in Chiyoda, Tokyo, Japan
Nippon Life Stadium, former baseball stadium in Osaka, Japan
Nissay Red Elf, professional women's table tennis team in the T.League
Nissei Corporation

See also 
Nisshin (disambiguation)